Common centipede is the common name of two centipede species:

Lithobius forficatus, a Eurasian stone centipede
Scolopendra morsitans, an originally African centipede, now found also in many other localities

The Centipede grass is also sometimes called common centipede.

Animal common name disambiguation pages